= SKA Khabarovsk =

SKA Khabarovsk may refer to:

- FC SKA-Khabarovsk, a Russian football club
- Amur Khabarovsk, founded as SKA Khabarovsk, a Russian ice hockey team
